C. varia  may refer to:
 Chlamys varia, the variegated scallop, a small scallop species
 Codophila varia, an insect species
 Conyza varia, a species of aster flowers found in Cape Verde

See also
 Varia (disambiguation)